Aloeides damarensis, the Damara copper, is a butterfly of the family Lycaenidae. It is found in South Africa, where it is found from coastal KwaZulu-Natal to the Drakensberg, north into Mpumalanga and Limpopo provinces.

The wingspan is 25–32 mm for males and 28–36 mm for females. Adults are on wing from September to April in the southern part of the range and year-round in the north.

The larvae feed on Aspalathus species.

Subspecies

Aloeides damarensis damarensis (Western, Northern and Eastern Cape and south-western Free State)
Aloeides damarensis mashona Tite & Dickson, 1973 (from northern KwaZulu-Natal to Mpumalanga, Gauteng, Limpopo and North West provinces)

References

Butterflies described in 1891
Aloeides
Endemic butterflies of South Africa